Jérôme Tharaud (18 May 1874, Saint-Junien, Haute-Vienne – 28 January 1953, Varengeville-sur-Mer) was a French writer. He was awarded the Prix Goncourt in 1906, and was elected the fifteenth occupant of Académie française seat 31 in 1938.

References

External links

 

1874 births
1953 deaths
People from Haute-Vienne
19th-century French writers
20th-century French non-fiction writers
Members of the Académie Française
Officiers of the Légion d'honneur
Prix Goncourt winners
19th-century French male writers
20th-century French male writers